Division No. 4, Subd. C is an unorganized subdivision on St. George's Bay on the island of Newfoundland in Newfoundland and Labrador, Canada. It is in Division No. 4.
According to the 2016 Statistics Canada Census:
Population: 747
% Change (2011 to 2016): 2.6
Dwellings: 490
Area: 2378.34 km2
Density: 0.3 people/km2

Division No. 4, Subd. C includes the unincorporated communities of
Barachois Brook
 Flat Bay
 Mattis Point
 St. Teresa

References

Newfoundland and Labrador subdivisions